Jerez de la Frontera is a city in Andalusia, Spain.

Jerez also may refer to:

Geography 
Jerez de García Salinas, Mexico
Jerez (river), Serbia

Spain 
Jerez de los Caballeros, Extremadura
Jérez del Marquesado, Granada
Taifa of Jerez, a small independent emirate created c. 1145

Other uses 
 Sherry (Spanish: Jerez), a fortified wine
 Circuito de Jerez, a racetrack near Jerez de la Frontera

See also 
 Jerez Airport
 Banda Jerez, a Mexican band
 Siege of Jerez (disambiguation)